Eclipta is a genus of flowering plants in the family Asteraceae.

 Species
 Eclipta alatocarpa  - Queensland, Northern Territory, South Australia
 Eclipta angustata - apparently native to Nepal and Bengal; widely naturalized in China, Ryukyu Islands, Southeast Asia, northern India
 Eclipta elliptica - southern Brazil, Uruguay, northeastern Argentina
 Eclipta leiocarpa  - Colombia
 Eclipta megapotamica - southern Brazil, Uruguay, northeastern Argentina
 Eclipta paludicola - southern Brazil
 Eclipta platyglossa  - Australia
 Eclipta prostrata - Japan, China, Nepal, Australia, North and South America; naturalized in Europe, Africa, Pacific Islands
 Eclipta pusilla - Puerto Rico

References

Asteraceae genera
Heliantheae